The National Norwegian Graphic Design Awards in an annual ceremony which gives tribute to the professionals working with visual communication in Norway. Established in 1993, the Visuelt has gradually grown to become the most important competition for designers and illustrators in Norway.

The main categories are: Graphic Design, Illustration, Interactive Design and Moving Image.

The 2012 National Norwegian Graphic Design Awards were presented on May 4, 2012, in Oslo.

References

External links

Design awards
Norwegian awards
Awards established in 1993